Hamatocaulis vernicosus, the varnished hook-moss, is a species of moss belonging to the family Amblystegiaceae.

It has cosmopolitan distribution.

Taxonomy

Synonyms
Drepanocladus vernicosus (Mitt.) Warnst.
Drepanocladus vernicosus var. gracile G. Roth
Hypnum lycopodioides var. genuinum Sanio
Hypnum pellucidum Wilson ex Jur.
Hypnum vernicosum var. fluitans Warnst.
Limprichtia vernicosa (Mitt.) Loeske
Scorpidium vernicosum (Mitt.) Tuom.
Stereodon vernicosus Mitt.

References

Hypnales